The tambura is a stringed instrument that is played as a folk instrument in Bosnia and Herzegovina, Bulgaria, Croatia, North Macedonia,
and Serbia (especially Vojvodina). It has doubled steel strings and is played with a plectrum, in the same manner as a mandolin.

The Bulgarian tambura
The Bulgarian tambura has 8 steel strings in 4 doubled courses. All the courses are tuned in unison, with no octaves. It is tuned D3 D3, G3 G3, B3 B3, E4 E4. It has a floating bridge and a metal tailpiece. The instrument body is often carved from a single block of wood.

The Macedonian tambura 
The Macedonian tambura has 4 steel strings in 2 doubled courses. It is tuned A A , D D (or another pitch but at the same relative intervals of a fourth) when playing melodies based on A tonic upon A drone. It also may be tuned G G , D D (or another pitch but at the same relative intervals of a fifth) when playing melodies based on G tonic upon G drone. Sometimes octave strings are used on the lower course. It has a floating bridge and a metal tailpiece. The instrument body is more often made from staves like a lute.

Playing technique
It is played with a plectrum, playing short tones which are plucked from the top down, while playing long tones with fast tremolo. For solo playing or to accompany a singer, they are played in the traditional manner, which is to play a melody on the highest course whilst using the other course or courses as a drone. The more modern way, which is more used in orchestras or other groups, is to play single line melodies using all courses.

Form
Both varieties of tambura have a long, narrow neck with 18 to 24 frets. The frets are nowadays always arranged in the normal Western 12 note scale, although in the past the Farkas system was also used. The Bulgarian tambura's body is rather shallow and flat, whereas the Macedonian tambura has a much more rounded, bowl-like body.

See also
Instruments of the Tamburica orchestras
The mandolin family
The bouzouki
Tambura

References
The stringed instrument database
Atlas of plucked instruments

Serbian musical instruments
Bulgarian musical instruments
Macedonian musical instruments
Necked lutes